The Udbastu Adhikar Raksha Samity (‘Refugee Rights Protection Association’) was a refugee organization in Tripura, India, led by the Revolutionary Socialist Party, which existed during the 1950s. The organization criticized the refugee policies of the Congress government for not implementing a planned refugee Rehabilitation Policy, and that this had contributed to the misery of the refugees. The organization demanded a loan system with low rates to refugees and distribution of agricultural lands to them.

References

Organisations based in Tripura
Mass organisations of the Revolutionary Socialist Party (India)
Organizations with year of establishment missing
1950s in Tripura